Pu Haiqing (born December 1941) is a Chinese politician who spent served as mayor of Chongqing from 1997 to 1999. He was a delegate to the 9th and 10th National People's Congress, and a member of the Standing Committee of the 11th National People's Congress. He was a member of the 15th and 16th Central Committee of the Chinese Communist Party.

Biography
Pu was born in Nanbu County, Sichuan, in December 1941. In 1961, he entered Chongqing University, majoring in steel rolling. After university in December 1968, he was assigned to the Fourth Branch of Chongqing Iron and Steel Company (later renamed Chongqing Iron and Steel Group Corporation). He moved up the ranks to become factory deputy director in September 1979 and general manager of Chongqing Iron and Steel Group Corporation in December 1982.

He joined the Chinese Communist Party (CCP) in November 1973, and got involved in politics in January 1985, when he was appointed deputy director of Sichuan Provincial Economic Commission, and three months later was promoted to the director position. He also served as vice governor of Sichuan. He was appointed executive vice governor in March 1992 and was admitted to member of the Standing Committee of the CCP Sichuan Provincial Committee, the province's top authority. In February 1996, he was made executive deputy party secretary. In September 1996, he was named acting mayor of Chongqing, confirmed in June 1997. He was director and party branch secretary of the State Bureau of Metallurgical Industry in June 1996, and held that office until February 2001. He served as deputy director of the Three Gorges Project Committee of the State Council in February 2001, and two years later promoted to the director position. In March 2008, he took office as vice chairperson of the National People's Congress Environment Protection and Resources Conservation Committee.

References

1941 births
Living people
People from Nanchong
Chongqing University alumni
Mayors of Chongqing
People's Republic of China politicians from Sichuan
Chinese Communist Party politicians from Sichuan
Delegates to the 9th National People's Congress
Delegates to the 11th National People's Congress
Members of the Standing Committee of the 12th National People's Congress
Members of the 15th Central Committee of the Chinese Communist Party
Members of the 16th Central Committee of the Chinese Communist Party